Zorzor District is one of six districts located in Lofa County, Liberia.  Zorzor is principal city of the county.

Among the county's natives was Joseph Nargba Cooper; born in the district town of Gbaudi in 1918, Cooper was a member of the House of Representatives from 1967 until his 1975 death.

References

Districts of Liberia
Lofa County